Hebeloma vejlense is a species of agaric fungus in the family Hymenogastraceae. Discovered in Denmark growing on a lawn under Tilia, it was described as new to science in 2005.

See also
List of Hebeloma species

References

Fungi described in 2005
Fungi of Europe
vejlense